Ancalagon may refer to:
Ancalagon the Black, a dragon from the works of J.R.R. Tolkien
Ancalagon (worm), a fossil genus of priapulid worms
Ankalagon saurognathus, a Paleocene mesonychid mammal, originally named Ancalagon and later renamed